The first season of the comedy-drama science fiction television series The Orville was broadcast on Fox from September 10 to December 7, 2017. The series was created and written by Seth MacFarlane who stars as Captain Ed Mercer, who commands the Orville. The series also stars Adrianne Palicki as Commander Kelly Grayson, Mercer's ex-wife. The Orville is set about 400 years in the future and follows the crew of the titular spaceship who face the dangers and wonders of outer space, while dealing with the familiar problems of everyday life.

Summary
Storylines include Ed and Kelly repairing their relationship, Alara facing challenges as a Union officer, Bortus questioning his people's culture following the birth of his child and the crew's conflict with the Krill.

Cast

Main
 Seth MacFarlane as Captain Ed Mercer, who commands the Orville. Mercer was an up-and-coming officer, on the fast track to commanding his own heavy cruiser. Following the end of his marriage to his wife Kelly due to her adultery, he is cited for being lax in performance of his duties and for being hung over on the job. Despite this, he is informed that the Orville needs a new commanding officer, and that he is the man for the job.
 Adrianne Palicki as Commander Kelly Grayson, first officer of the Orville and Ed Mercer's ex-wife, who goes to bat for him after their break-up, securing his position on The Orville.
 Penny Johnson Jerald as Dr. Claire Finn, chief medical officer on the Orville, holding the rank of lieutenant commander. She has expertise in molecular surgery, DNA engineering and psychiatry. These exceptional credentials gave her her choice of assignments on heavy cruisers.
 Scott Grimes as Lieutenant  Gordon Malloy, the helmsman of the Orville and Mercer's best friend. Considered the best helmsman in the fleet, he was relegated to desk duty after he attempted to impress a girl with a precarious shuttle docking maneuver, damaging the vessel and losing cargo in the process.
 Peter Macon as Lieutenant Commander Bortus, the second officer aboard the USS Orville. Bortus is from Moclus, a planet where the primary industry is weapons manufacturing, and whose society is dominated by males.
 Halston Sage as Lieutenant  Alara Kitan
 J Lee as Lieutenant John LaMarr, later Lieutenant Commander John LaMarr
 Mark Jackson as Isaac

Recurring
 Victor Garber as Admiral Tom Halsey
 Chad L. Coleman as Klyden
 Norm Macdonald as the voice of Lt. Yaphit
 Rachael MacFarlane as the voice of Orville Computer

Development
The Orville was written by Seth MacFarlane as a spec script. Fox ordered thirteen episodes for the first season, but only twelve were broadcast due to a gap in broadcast dates caused by the broadcaster's lengthy Christmas programming. The leftover episode, "Primal Urges", aired during season 2, which was ordered by Fox on November 2, 2017.

Episodes

Reception

Critical response
The first season of The Orville was met with a negative response from critics albeit a more positive response from audiences. On Rotten Tomatoes, the season has a 30% approval rating from critics, with an average rating of 5.2/10 based on 53 critic reviews. The website's critics consensus reads, "An odd jumble of campiness and sincerity, homage, and satire, The Orville never quite achieves liftoff." On Metacritic, which uses a weighted average, it has a score of 36 out of 100, based on 21 reviews, indicating "generally unfavorable reviews".

Ratings

Awards and nominations

Home media release
The season was released on DVD on December 11, 2018.

Music
The soundtrack album for season 1 was released by La-La Land Records on January 22, 2019.

References

External links
 
 

The Orville
2017 American television seasons